This is a list of tanker aircraft used for aerial refuelling of another aircraft whilst in powered flight.

Refueling methods

Looped hose The first commercial method employed a hose which was held slack in a trailing half-loop behind both aircraft. The receiving aircraft flew just below the tanker and deployed a steel line, which the tanker caught with its own grappling line and drew in. The tanker then connected the first steel line to the refueling hose and paid it out as the receiving aircraft reeled it back in.
Probe-and-drogue The tanker trails a flexible hose with a stabilising drogue on the end and the receiving aircraft manoeuvers to insert a short probe into the receptacle in the drogue.
Flying boom The tanker extends a hinged telescopic boom with aerodynamic control surfaces on its end. An operator "flies" it to match up with a receptacle on the receiving aircraft, which then moves forwards to make the connection.
Wing-to-wing A hybrid method in which the tanker trails a flexible hose from a wing and the receiving aircraft catches it in a hooked receptacle under one of its own wings.
Buddy refueling An aircraft type is fitted with both supply and receiving hardware, so that one aircraft can refuel another of the same type.

Gallery
These images illustrate various aerial refuelling methods.

List of aircraft

|+ military tanker aircraft used to refuel other aircraft in flight
!Tankeraircraft
!basedon
!aircraftpropulsionmethod
!Fuelsupplymethod
!Operators
!Date entered use
!Currentstatus
!Qty
!Notes
|-
|Airbus A310 MRTT||AirbusA310-300C||2x turbofan jet||probe and drogue||Canada / France / Germany||||operational||6||Two for Royal Canadian Air Force (RCAF), known in service as CC-150T Polaris
|-
|Airbus A330 MRTT||AirbusA330-200||2x turbofan jet||probe and drogue||United Kingdom||||production/ operational||7 KC25(+2) KC3||In Royal Air Force (RAF) service, it is exclusively hose-and-drogue, and is known as Voyager KC2 (two under-wing hose and drogue) and Voyager KC3 (two under-wing hose and drogue plus under-fuselage centreline high capacity hose and drogue), with no self-refuelling capability. 14 aircraft have been delivered: seven KC2, five KC3 and two fitted out as KC3.
|-
|Airbus A330 MRTT||AirbusA330-200||2x turbofan jet||flying boom||Australia / Saudi Arabia / Spain / United Arab Emirates /  Multinational Multi-Role Tanker Transport Fleet|| ||production/ operational|| 61 ||Versions operated by the Australian (designated KC-30), Emirati, Saudi air forces and the Multinational Multi-Role Tanker Transport Fleet are equipped with both a flying boom and hose and drogue refuelling units. 
|-
|AirbusA400MAtlas||AirbusA400MAtlas||4x Europrop TP400 turboprop||probe and drogue||Spain / Germany / France||||operational|| || 
|-
|Airco DH.4||Airco DH.4|| propeller||gravity flow hose||United States||||retired||1||US Army Air Service trials at Rockwell Field, San Diego, California.
|-
|Avro Lancaster||Avro Lancaster||4x propeller||probe and drogue||United Kingdom||||retired|| ||Purchased and converted by Flight Refuelling Limited (FRL).
|-
|Avro Lancastrian||Avro Lancaster||4x propeller||probe and drogue||United Kingdom||||retired||4||Purchased and converted by Flight Refuelling Limited (FRL), two Lancastrian tankers were based at Shannon, Ireland; the other two in North America, at Goose Bay, Labrador, and Gander, Newfoundland.
|-
|Avro Lincoln||Avro Lincoln||4x propeller||probe and drogue||United Kingdom|| ||retired|| ||Purchased and converted by Flight Refuelling Limited (FRL).
|-
|Avro Vulcan K.2||Avro Vulcan||4x jet||probe and drogue||United Kingdom|| 1982 ||retired|| 6 || Conversions as interim until VC.10 tankers ready.
|-
|BlackburnBuccaneer S.2|| BlackburnBuccaneerS.2||2x turbofan jet||probe and drogue||United Kingdom|| ||retired|| ||Buddy-buddy refuelling.
|-
|BoeingKB-29M||Boeing B-29 Superfortress||4x propeller||probe and drogue||United States||||retired||126||The world’s first aerial refuelling units were created; the 43d Air Refueling Squadron at Davis-Monthan AFB, Arizona, and the 509th at Walker AFB, Roswell, New Mexico.  Earlier KB-29M versions used a 'grappling hose' system, later models used a true probe and drogue.  One KB-29M, redesignated YKB-29T (nicknamed 'Triple Nipple'), was modified to have another two refuelling hoses on its wingtip.
|-
|BoeingKB-29P||Boeing B-29 Superfortress||4x propeller||flying boom||United States||||retired||100+||
|-
|BoeingKB-50||Boeing B-50 Superfortress||4x propeller||probe and drogue||United States|| ||retired|| ||An improved model of the B-29 Superfortress.
|-
|BoeingKB-50||Boeing B-50 Superfortress||4x propeller||flying boom||United States|| ||retired|| ||A B-29 derivative.
|-
|Boeing KC-97 Stratofreighter||Boeing C-97 Stratofreighter||4x propeller||flying boom||United States / Israel|| ||retired|| ||Based on the B-50, itself another B-29 Superfortress descendant.
|-
|BoeingKC-135Stratotanker||Boeing367-80(Dash 80)||4x jet||flying boom||United States / Turkey / France / Chile / Singapore|| ||operational|| ||Boom can be fitted pre-flight with a drogue adapter.  AdlA C-135FR/KC-135R Stratotankers use the probe and drogue system and are in the process of being replaced by Airbus A330MRTT 'Phenix'. Singapores KC-135's have been by A330MRTT's and were sold to Meta Aerospace in the USA.
|-
|Boeing MQ-25 Stingray||Boeing MQ-25 Stingray||turbofan||probe and drogue||United States|| ||in development|| || aerial refueling drone
|-
|Boeing 707||Boeing 707||4x jet||probe and drogue||Canada / Israel / Spain / Italy|| ||operational|| ||New built and conversions of airliners with multi-point refuelling system pods. Israel allegedly converted ex-airliners with booms from withdrawn KC-97's. Two for RCAF as cCC-137 Husky, Spain and Italy have retired their 707 tanker aircraft.
|-
|Boeing KC-33A||Boeing747-100||4x jet||flying boom||Iran|| || ||4||KC-33A is a modified Boeing 747 which lost in the USAF bidding competition to the KC-10 Extender.  Four sold to the Iranian Air Force, one operational remaining.
|-
| Boeing 767MMTT||Boeing 767||2x jet||probe and drogue||Colombia|| ||operational|| 1 ||Multi Mission Tanker Transport (MMTT) conversion by IAI for the  Fuerza Aérea Colombiana (FAC), a 767-200ER fitted with two ARP3 refuelling pods under the wings, and cargo door.
|-
|Boeing KC-767||Boeing767-200ER||2x jet||flying boom||Italy / Japan|| ||operational|| 8 ||With cockpit updates, was (eventually) the winning entry in the USAF KC-X competition.
|-
|Boeing KC-46 Pegasus||Boeing767-200ER||2x jet||flying boom||United States|| ||production|| ||USAF designation for Boeing's updated winning KC-767 entry.
|-
|Boeing F/A-18E/F Super Hornet||Boeing F/A-18E/F Super Hornet||2x jet||probe and drogue||United States|| || || ||Equipped for buddy-buddy refuelling as 'Strike tankers'.  Taking over tanking duties after the S-3 was retired from service.
|-
|ConsolidatedB-24 Liberator||Consolidated B-24 Liberator||4x propeller|| ||United States||||retired|| ||Used for flight tests with a B–17E receiver.
|-
|Dassault-Breguet Super Étendard||Dassault-Breguet Super Étendard||jet||probe and drogue||France|| || || ||Buddy-buddy refuelling.
|-
|Dassault Rafale||Dassault Rafale||2x jet||probe and drogue||France|| || || ||Buddy-buddy refuelling.
|-
|de Havilland Sea Vixen||de Havilland Sea Vixen||2x jet||probe and drogue||United Kingdom|| ||retired|| ||Buddy-buddy refuelling.
|-
|DouglasKA-3BSkywarrior||Douglas A-3 Skywarrior||jet||probe and drogue||United States|| ||retired|| ||Dedicated tanker variant of the Skywarrior.  Primary US Navy tanker from the Vietnam War until retirement prior to Desert Storm.
|-
|Douglas A-4 Skyhawk||Douglas A-4 Skyhawk||turbojet||probe and drogue||United States|| ||retired|| ||Buddy-buddy refuelling.
|-
|Douglas C-1||Douglas C-1||propeller||gravity flow hose||United States||||retired||2||The C-1 was a single-engine transport, 6,445-pound biplane, transformed into tankers by installing two 150-gallon tanks for off-loading, and a refuelling hose that passed through a hatch cut in the floor.
|-
|EmbraerKC-390||Embraer C-390 Millennium||2x turbofan||probe and drogue||Brazil|| || || ||Cobham air-to-air refuelling system.
|-
|GrummanKA-6DIntruder||Grumman A-6 Intruder||2x jet||probe and drogue||United States|| ||retired|| ||Dedicated tanker variant of the Intruder.  Attack variants of the A-6 also capable of buddy-buddy tanking.
|-
|HandleyPageHP.54Harrow||HandleyPageHP.54Harrow||2x propeller||looped hose||United Kingdom||||retired||3||Three Harrows were operated by Flight Refuelling Limited, and refuelled Short Empire flying boats on transatlantic services, two from Gander, Newfoundland and one based in Foynes, Ireland.
|-
|Handley PageType W||Handley PageW.10||2x propeller||looped hose||United Kingdom||||retired||2||Early trials and demonstrations by Flight Refuelling Ltd using a piston engined biplane.
|-
|HandleyPageVictor||HandleyPageVictor||4x jet||probe and drogue||United Kingdom||||retired||30||B(K).1A, K.1, K.1A and K.2 variants in Royal Air Force service, operated by No. 55 Squadron from RAF Marham.  A number of Victor tankers saw action during Black Buck raids of the 1982 Falklands War, refuelling the Avro Vulcan bombers multiple times during each bombing run.  Fleet retired October 1993.
|-
|Ilyushin Il-78 Midas||Ilyushin Il-76||4x turbofan||probe and drogue||USSR, India, China|| || || || 
|-
|Lockheed HC-130 Hercules & KC-130 Hercules||LockheedC-130Hercules &C-130JSuper Hercules||4x turboprop||probe and drogue||Canada / Indonesia / United Kingdom / United States|| || || ||Variants: Royal Canadian Air Force modified C-130H, Indonesian Air Force modified KC-130B, Royal Air Force modified C-130K, United States Marine Corps modified C-130F.
|-
|LockheedKS-3B||Lockheed S-3 Viking||2x turbofan||probe and drogue||United States|| ||retired|| ||The former primary US Navy carrier-based tanker, equipped for buddy-buddy tanking.
|-
|LockheedTriStarK1/KC1||LockheedL-1011-500TriStar||3x turbofan ||probe and drogue||United Kingdom||||retired||6||Two K1 and four KC1 variants operated by No. 216 Squadron Royal Air Force from RAF Brize Norton.  Fleet retired 24 March 2014.
|-
|LTV A-7Corsair II||LTV A-7Corsair II||jet||probe and drogue||Greece / United States|| ||retired|| ||Equipped for buddy-buddy tanking in US Navy and Greek Air Force service.
|-
|McDonnellDouglasKC-10Extender||McDonnellDouglasDC-10||3x jet||flying boom||Netherlands / United States|| ||operational|| ||Also has a retractable hose and drogue that can be selected in-flight.  Can be fitted with two underwing pods (similar to the KC-135's MPRS) capable of simultaneously refuelling two receiver aircraft (Wing Air Refueling Pods or WARPs).  The Royal Netherlands Air Force operates one out of originally two KDC-10s; former civil aircraft modified to a standard similar to the KC-10. The remaining KDC-10 will be withdrawn by the end of 2021. After overhaul, it will follow the other KDC-10 to be operated with Omega Aerial Refueling Services.
|-
|MikoyanMiG-29K||MikoyanMiG-29M||jet||probe and drogue||USSR|| || || ||Buddy-buddy refuelling.
|-
|MyasishchevM-4-2||MyasishchevM-4 bomber||4x jet||probe and drogue||USSR|| ||retired|| || 
|-
|Myasishchev3MS-2||Myasishchev3M bomber||4x jet||probe and drogue||USSR|| ||retired|| || 
|-
|PanaviaTornado||PanaviaTornado||2x turbofan ||probe and drogue|| || ||retired|| ||Buddy-buddy refuelling.
|-
|SukhoiSu-24M||SukhoiSu-24||2x jet||probe and drogue||USSR|| || || ||Equipped for buddy-buddy refuelling in the Russian Air Force with the in-flight refuelling pod ( – UPAZ) container as 'Strike tankers'.
|-
|SukhoiSu-33||SukhoiSu-33||2x jet||probe and drogue||USSR|| || || ||Buddy-buddy refuelling.
|-
|SupermarineScimitar|| SupermarineScimitar||jet||probe and drogue||United Kingdom|| ||retired|| ||Buddy-buddy refuelling.
|-
|TupolevTu-16N||TupolevTu-16 bomber||2x jet||probe and drogue||USSR|| || || || 
|-
|TupolevTu-16Z||TupolevTu-16||2x jet||wing to wing||USSR|| || || || 
|-
|VickersValiant B(K).1, B(PR)K.1 || VickersValiant||4x jet||probe and drogue||United Kingdom|| ||retired|| ||The Valiants had removable tanker system in the bomb bay. Operated by Royal Air Force.
|-
|VickersVC10C1K, K2, K3, K4]]||VickersVC10||4x turbofan ||probe and drogue||United Kingdom|| ||retired||27||C1K (13), K2 (5), K3 (4), and K4 (5) variants served with the Royal Air Force, operated by 10 Squadron, 101 Squadron, and 1312 Flight.  Fleet retired 20 September 2013.
|-
|XianH-6U||XianH-6||2x jet||probe and drogue|| China|| || || ||People's Liberation Army Air Force (PLAAF) of China.
|-
|XianYU-20||XianY-20||4x jet||probe and drogue|| China|| || || ||People's Liberation Army Air Force (PLAAF) of China.
|-
|}

References

 
Lists of aircraft by role
Lists of military aircraft
Military logistics